Goniothalamus giganteus is a species of plant in the family Annonaceae. It is native to Malaya, Myanmar, Sumatra and Thailand. Joseph Dalton Hooker and  Thomas Thomson, the British botanists who first formally described the species, named it after its exceptionally large ( in Latin) flowers.

Description
Its young branches are smooth and its older branches have white bark with a wrinkled surface. Its petioles are 8 millimeters long. Its leathery, stiff leaves are 16.2-27 by 4.8-8.1 centimeters. The upper surfaces of the leaves are shiny  and dark green, while the undersides are paler. Its large yellow flowers are on 2.7-4.1 centimeters long peduncles that are in axillary positions. Its 3 broad, oval sepals are 1.8 centimeters long and come to a blunt point at their tips. The sepals have woolly hairs on both surfaces. Its flowers have 6 petals in two rows of 3. Its outer petals are 10.8 by 5.4 centimeters with a clawed base and wavy margins.  Both sides of the outer petals have fine hairs and the base of the inner surface has golden silky hairs. The inner petals have dense silky hairs and are united in the upper 1.8 centimeters of their margins. The flowers' receptacles are flat and hollowed out in the middle. It has numerous stamen. Its ovaries are linear to oblong.  Its styles are filiform with slightly club-shaped tips.

Reproductive Biology
Its pollen is shed as permanent tetrads.

Habitat and Distribution
It has been observed growing in evergreen forests, swampy lowlands, and hillsides at elevations of 0 to 900 meters.

Uses
Bioactive compounds extracted from its bark have been reported to have cytotoxic activity in tests with cultured human cancer cells.

References

giganteus
Flora of Malaya
Flora of Myanmar
Flora of Sumatra
Flora of Thailand
Species described in 1855
Taxa named by Joseph Dalton Hooker
Taxa named by Thomas Thomson (botanist)